Daudebardia rufa is a species of air-breathing land snail or semi-slug, a terrestrial pulmonate gastropod mollusk in the family Oxychilidae, which belongs to the limacoid clade.

Daudebardia rufa is the type species of the genus Daudebardia. This species is a predatory carnivore.

Description 
The length of the body 16–20 mm. The color of the skin is blue-grey.

The shell is perforate, depressed, transversely dilated, slightly striate, very shining, and corneous or rufous in colour. The spire is moderate and sublateral. The shell has three whorls. The last whorl in adults is elongated and is not angulated. The aperture is large and has a rounded oval shape. The length of the shell is 5.5 mm.

Distribution 
The distribution of this species is in central and southern Europe including Bulgaria, Czech Republic, Slovakia, and Ukraine.

References

External links 

 "Species summary for Daudebardia rufa". AnimalBase

Oxychilidae
Gastropods described in 1805